Eastoft railway station was a station in Eastoft, Lincolnshire on the Axholme Joint Railway.

History
It officially closed on 17 July 1933 but as there was no Sunday service the last train ran on 15 July 1933. The last passenger service to use the line through the station was run by the North Axholme Secondary School on 1 April 1965.

Route

References

Disused railway stations in the Borough of North Lincolnshire
Former Axholme Joint Railway stations
Railway stations in Great Britain opened in 1903
Railway stations in Great Britain closed in 1933